Bhookailas is a 1958 Indian Telugu-language Hindu mythological film directed by K. Shankar. It stars N. T. Rama Rao, Akkineni Nageswara Rao, Jamuna with music composed by R. Sudarsanam and R. Govardhanam. It was produced by A. V. Meiyappan under the AVM Productions banner.

The story is based on the Sthala Purana of Gokarna Kshetram in Karnataka. The film was released in Tamil as Bhaktha Ravana.  Previously, a film was made with the same story casting different artists in Tamil in 1938 and in Telugu in 1940 with the same title which were adaptation of the famous Kannada stage play Bhookailasa by Sri Sahitya Samrajya Nataka Mandali of Mysore. A. V. Meiyappan also shot the movie simultaneously in Kannada as Bhookailasa starring Rajkumar.

Plot 
Raksha's King Ravana decides to invade Amaravati, the capital of the heavenly kingdom of Indra. Scared of Ravana's plans, Indra asks Narada for help. Narada informs Indra that Ravana's strength comes from the worship performed by Kaikasi, Ravana's mother. He suggests that Indra sabotage Ravana's mother's worship of Saikatha Lingam, a sand sculpture representation of Lord Siva.

Ravana decides to perform penance and bring Lord Siva's Atma Lingam for his mother to worship. Hearing of Ravana's plans from Narada, Goddess Parvathi, Lord Siva's consort, appeals to Lord Vishnu. When Lord Siva appears to Ravana to grant his wish, Lord Vishnu manipulates Ravana's mind and makes him wish for Goddess Parvathi. As Ravana proceeds home with Goddess Parvathi, Narada meets him midway and tells him that his companion is a fake Parvathi. Dejected by the subterfuge, Ravana returns Goddess Parvathi to Lord Siva.

During his return journey, he meets Mandodari, the young princess of Pathala. Believing she is the real Goddess Parvathi, he marries her. Eventually, he realizes what happened and appeals to Lord Siva for forgiveness by presenting his severed head. Lord Siva presents Ravana with Atma Lingam and warns him that, if the Atma Lingam ever touches the earth, it can never be moved again. Narada instigates Lord Vinayaka to trick Ravana into grounding the Atma Lingam at what later became known as Gokarna Kshethram in Karnataka.

Cast 
Nandamuri Taraka Rama Rao as Ravana
Akkineni Nageswara Rao as Narada Maharshi
Jamuna as Mandodari
S. V. Ranga Rao as Mayasura
Nagabhushanam as Lord Siva
Mahankali Venkaiah as Kumbhakarna
B. Saroja Devi as Goddess Parvati
Hemalatha as Kaikesi
Helen as Apsara (in song Sundaranga Andukora)
Vijaya Nirmala as Goddess Sita
Kamala Lakshman as Dancer (in song Munneeta Pavalinchu)

Soundtrack 

Music composed by R. Sudarsanam, R. Govardhanam. Lyrics were written by Samudrala Sr.

Adaptations

Other 
 VCDs & DVDs on – VOLGA Videos, Hyderabad
 VCDs & DVDs on – SHALIMAR Video Company, Hyderabad

References

External links 
 Bhookailas at IMDb
 Bhookailas review at Cinegoer.com
 Listen to the songs of Bhookailas at Dishant.com

1958 films
1950s Telugu-language films
Films scored by R. Sudarsanam
Films based on the Ramayana
AVM Productions films
Films directed by K. Shankar